The Embassy of Israel to Nepal is the diplomatic mission of Israel in Nepal.  The Embassy was established in March 1961 after diplomatic relations were established between the two countries in June 1960, under the leadership of David Ben-Gurion, the first Prime Minister of Israel and B.P. Koirala, the first elected Prime Minister of Nepal.

Israel opened its Embassy in Kathmandu in March 1961. Nepal opened a Consulate General in Israel in November 1993 and then the Embassy of Nepal in Israel on 17 August 2007.

Ambassadors of Israel to Nepal 
The following is the list of ambassadors:
 1961–1963 Eliashiv Ben-Horin (Non-Resident, Naypyidaw) 1960 - 1963
 1964–1965 Moshe Erell; Meshulum Varon
 1965–1967 Moshe Erell
 1967–1970 Mordechai Avgar
 1970–1975 Avshalorn Caspi
 1975–1977 Yair Aran
 1977–1981 Shammy Z. Laor
 1981–1983 Shaul Kariv
 1983–1985 Ann Marie Finkler Lambert
 1985–1987 Baruch Gilad
 1987–1991 Shmuel E. Moyal
 1991–1993 Shlomo Dayan
 1993–1997 Esther Efrat‑Smilg
 1998 - 1999 Benny Omer 
 2000–2003 Avraham Nir
 2003–2005 Dan Ben-Eliezer
 2005–2010 Dan Stav
 2011–2014 Hanan Goder-Goldberger
 2014–2017 Yaron Mayer 
 2017– Benny Omer

Cooperation 
Israel has inked cooperation with Nepal in the following sectors:

A Protocol of Cooperation between the Federation of Nepalese Chambers of Commerce and Industry and the Federation of Israeli Chambers of Commerce was signed on 25 June 1993 in Tel-Aviv during a visit to Israel by prime minister  Girija Prasad Koirala of Nepal.

A Memorandum of Understanding (MoU) between the governments of Nepal and Israel relating to a scholarship program, 16 February 1995 was signed by the Joint Secretary, Ministry of Finance of Nepal and the Ambassador of Israel.

A Framework Agreement on Cooperation in the field of Agriculture was signed in March 2010 between the governments of Israel and Nepal.

Mashav in Nepal 
Activities of Israel's Agency for International Development Cooperation (Mashav) in Nepal started in the 1960s.  Since then more than 1500 Nepalese professionals have participated in Mashav training courses in Israel and in Nepal.

Mashav and Agricultural Development Bank Limited (ADBL) signed a MoU to enhance institutional efficiency and human resource development of ADBL. The cooperation is targeted to render banking services to rural small and medium-scale entrepreneurs to reduce the incidence of poverty, provide rural and modern banking services and ensure the financial viability and sustainability of ADBL.

MASHAV and the United Nations World Food Programme (WFP) signed a Memorandum of Cooperation (MOC) in the field of Water Management (Irrigation and Drinking Water System) on 26 February 2010. It is intended to encourage the open exchange of information and ideas that enhance capacity building program objectives and strengthen institutional capabilities; promote an exchange of relevant technical resources and assist to enhance impact and sustainability through capacity building and training activities; and dispatch experts to identify areas of collaboration.

MASHAV, the United Nations International Children’s Emergency Fund (UNICEF), the United Nations Educational, Scientific and Cultural Organization (UNESCO) and Save the Children (SC) signed a Memorandum of Cooperation (MOC) in the field of Early Childhood Education and Development (ECED) on 10 December 2010. It aims to encourage exchange of information and of relevant technical resources and assistance.

In the first half of 2012 more than 50 professionals from Nepal participated in MASHAV courses in Israel.

The governments of Israel and Nepal on 17 March 2010 signed an Agreement on cooperation on agricultural development, exchange of technical and scientific knowledge on agriculture, the exchange of data and experience on agricultural policies and their implementation and cooperation between the associations, organizations and private sector of both countries.

Agriculture - 2
Education – 25
Community Development -2
Social Security - 2
Gender issues– 3
Medicine and Public Health – 2*
Communication- 1*

Activities
 A few scholarships are awarded each year for Nepalis to study in Israel.
 Nepal and Israel issued joint postage stamps for NPR 35 in Nepal and 5 Shekels in Israel, themed 'The highest point on Earth, Mount Everest (in Nepal), and the lowest point on Earth, the Dead Sea (in Israel)'.
 The Embassy of Israel has been organizing annual Israeli Film Festivals in Kathmandu since 2006, centered on a different theme each year.
 A "Dining in the Dark" restaurant in which diners eat in complete darkness was set up at Imagodei Restaurant, Nagpokhari, Kathmandu in aid of the Nepal Association for Blind, with the initiation of The Embassy of Israel in Kathmandu from 10 to 24 May 2012. This type of restaurant gives diners an impression of the experience of a blind person.
 An Eye Camp operated from 22 April to 2 May 2011 at Mane Kharka, Langtang Valley for the community in the mountainous region, providing free treatment for eye ailments.  An Israeli technology mobile operating room was run by the Eye From Zion organization; doctors from the Kathmandu University hospital, Dhulikhel Hospital volunteered for the camp.  The doctors had conducted eye examinations, treatments and surgeries at Mane Kharka.
 Israel issued several videos: Israel in Nepal's Channel, Israeli cuisine: ShakshukaChaminHummusFalafelSchnitzel, Medical Clown, Agricultural Demonstration Farm

Visits
A number of official visits to Israel have been made over the years by Nepalese dignitaries, starting with King Mahendra in September 1963. President Zalman Shazar of Israel made a state visit to Nepal in March 1966.

References

External links
 (https://web.archive.org/web/20120731120301/http://embassies.gov.il/kathmandu/Pages/default.aspx)
 The Israeli Government's Official Webpage
 Israel Embassy Facebook page
 MASHAV
 Embassy Publications
 Embassy Publication
 Embassy Publication
 Foreign Relations of Israel
 Israeli Film Fund
 (http://embassies.gov.il/kathmandu/AboutTheEmbassy/Pages/The-ambassador.aspx)

Kathmandu
Israel
Diplomatic missions in Nepal
Israel–Nepal relations
1961 establishments in Nepal